Al-Sukar Sport Club, is an Iraqi football team based in Al-Mejar Al-Kabir District, Maysan, that plays in the Iraq Division Two.

Managerial history
  Emad Hamid

See also 
 2021–22 Iraq Division Two

References

External links
 Iraq Clubs- Foundation Dates

2005 establishments in Iraq
Association football clubs established in 2005
Football clubs in Maysan